Mirandaphera is a genus of sea snails, marine gastropod mollusks in the family Cancellariidae, the nutmeg snails.

Species
Species within the genus Mirandaphera include:
 Mirandaphera arafurensis (Verhecken, 1997)
 Mirandaphera cayrei Bouchet & Petit, 2002
 Mirandaphera maestratii Bouchet & Petit, 2002
 Mirandaphera tosaensis (Habe, 1961a)

References

External links
  Bouchet P. & Petit R.E. (2002). New species of deep-water Cancellariidae (Gastropoda) from the southwestern Pacific. The Nautilus 116(3): 95-104

Cancellariidae